Count Károly Andrássy de Csíkszentkirály et Krasznahorka (February 29, 1792 – August 22, 1845) was a Hungarian politician, who served as emissary to Gömör és Kis-Hont County in the Diets of 1839 and 1844.

Background
His parents were Count József Andrássy, a military officer, and Countess Walburga Csáky de Körösszeg et Adorján. He married Countess Etelka Szapáry de Szapár, Muraszombat et Széchy-Sziget in Betlér, 1809.

They had four children:
 Kornélia (1820–1836)
 Manó (1821–1891): his wife was Countess Gabriella Pálffy de Erdőd (1833–1914)
 Gyula (1823–1890): Prime Minister of Hungary, Minister of Foreign Affairs of Austria-Hungary; his wife was Countess Katinka Kendeffy de Malomvíz
 Aladár (1827–1903): his wife was Baroness Leontina Wenckheim de Wenckheim (1841–1921).

Works
 Umrisse einer möglichen Reform in Ungarn. Im Geiste des Justemilieu. 2. Abth. London, 1833. (von A… jegygyel. 2. kiadása Altenburgban jelent meg ugyanazon évben névtelenül.)
 Az utak készitéséről. Rozsnyó, 1837.

External links
 József Szinnyei: Magyar írók élete és munkái I. (Aachs–Bzenszki). Budapest: Hornyánszky. 1891.
 

1792 births
1845 deaths
Hungarian politicians
Karoly